The jackal is a small animal in the dog/wolf family of mammals.

Jackal may also refer to:

Other animals
 American jackal, a former common name for the coyote (Canis latrans) of Central and North America
 Egyptian wolf (Canis lupus lupaster), a small subspecies of gray wolf also called the Egyptian jackal or wolf jackal
 Ethiopian wolf (Canis simensis), the Simien jackal or red jackal

People
 The Jackal (nickname)

Arts, entertainment, and media

Fictional entities
 Jackal (Gargoyles), a character in the Gargoyles universe
 Jackal (Marvel Comics), a comic book supervillain
 Jackal (The Day of the Jackal), the main character in the 1973 film
 Jackal, a species of extraterrestrial reptiles from the Halo video games
 The Jackal, a character in Far Cry 2
 Sydney Carton, sometimes referred to as "The Jackal" in Charles Dickens' A Tale of Two Cities
 Dr. Jackal or Kuroudou Akabane, a character in GetBackers
 Jackie the Jackal, a character in the television series Kim Possible
 Damian Spinelli or The Jackal, a character in the television series General Hospital

Films and soundtracks
 Jackals (2017 film), an American film
 The Day of the Jackal, a 1973 film adaptation of Forsyth's 1971 novel
 The Jackal (1997 film), an American film inspired by the 1973 film 
 The Jackal (soundtrack), the soundtrack to the 1997 film
 The Jackal (2010 film), a Turkish film
 The Jackals (1917 film), a French film
 The Jackals, a South African film

Literature
 Jackals (novel), a 1994 novel by Charles L. Grant
 The Day of the Jackal, a 1971 novel by Frederick Forsyth

Other arts, entertainment, and media
 Jackal (video game), a video game released in 1986 by Konami
 "The Jackal", a song by Ronny Jordan

Military and paramilitary
 Jackal (vehicle), a family of British military vehicles
 , eight ships of the Royal Navy
 Jackals, Serbian paramilitary group accused of committing war crimes in the Kosovo War

Sports teams
 Dallas Jackals, rugby team
 Elmira Jackals and Elmira Jr. "B" Jackals, ice hockey teams based in Elmira, New York
 New Jersey Jackals, professional baseball team
 Orlando Jackals, professional roller hockey team
 Philadelphia Jr. Jackals, ice hockey team

See also 
 Jackyl, an American rock band
 Jakkals, a small vehicle used by the South African military

Animal common name disambiguation pages